Ocrisiodes senganella is a species of snout moth in the genus Ocrisiodes. It was described by Hans Georg Amsel in 1961 and is known from Iran and Afghanistan.

References

Moths described in 1961
Phycitinae
Taxa named by Hans Georg Amsel